Vexillum (Costellaria) scitulum is a species of small sea snail, marine gastropod mollusk in the family Costellariidae, the ribbed miters.

Description
The shell size varies between 10 mm and 36 mm.

Distribution
This species is distributed in the Persian Gulf, in the Indian Ocean along Madagascar, Mozambique and in the South China Sea.

References

 Odhner, N.H.J. (1919). Contribution a la faune malacologique de Madagascar. Arkiv For Zoologi, K. Svenska Vetenskapsakademien 12(6). 52 pp, 4 pl
 Turner H. 2001. Katalog der Familie Costellariidae Macdonald, 1860. Conchbooks. 1–100-page(s): 58

External links
 
 Melvill, J. C. & Standen, R. (1901). The Mollusca of the Persian Gulf, Gulf of Oman and Arabian Seas as evidenced mainly through the collections of Mr. F. W. Townsend, 1893-1900, with descriptions of new species. Part 1, Cephalopoda, Gastropoda, Scaphopoda. Proceedings of the Zoological Society of London. 1901 (2): 327-460

scitulum
Gastropods described in 1853